Curimagua is a genus of dwarf orb-weavers that was first described by Raymond Robert Forster & Norman I. Platnick in 1977.  it contains two species, found in Venezuela and Panama: C. bayano and C. chapmani.

See also
 List of Symphytognathidae species

References

Araneomorphae genera
Spiders of Central America
Spiders of South America
Symphytognathidae
Taxa named by Raymond Robert Forster